Working in Partnership Programme (WiPP) was launched in England in 2004 under the new general medical services (nGMS) contract to support doctors in general practice by providing them with innovative ideas on how to improve services for the public.

Initiatives
The GMS contract provided the funds, while the initiatives are being implemented by a number of different agencies including primary care trusts as well as non-government organisations in England. The WiPP website provides several resources for this program. The programme has several initiatives.
 Self Care Support for people and professionals
 Self Care Support in Schools—Making Sense of Health project
 Database of Good Practice—identifies, reviews and signposts existing good examples in general practice in England
 Sickness Absence Management
 Workload Analysis Tool to help analyse workload data in general practices and other primary care organisations
 Improving the Management of Repeat Medicines in Primary Care
 Minor Illness Management
 Primary Care Management Development Programme resources
 General Practice Nursing—Getting it Right for Patients and Public Health
 Health Care Assistants—facilitating their employment, training, development and integration
 Vocational Training Scheme for General Practice managers
 National Primary Care Mental Health Collaborative

References

External links
The official website of the programme

National Health Service (England)